Stuart Hogg may refer to:
Stuart Hogg (born 1992), Scottish rugby player
Stuart Saunders Hogg (1833–1921), British civil servant